Airbus Military was a business unit of Airbus, which was part of European Aeronautic Defence and Space Company (EADS) from 2009 to 2013.

The company was formally created in April 2009 by the integration of the former Military Transport Aircraft Division (MTAD) and Airbus Military Sociedad Limitada (AMSL) into Airbus. In January 2014, former EADS divisions Airbus Military, Astrium, and Cassidian merged to form Airbus Defence and Space.

History
The predecessor company was established in January 1999 as Airbus Military Company SAS to manage the Airbus A400M project, taking over from the Euroflag consortium. In May 2003, the company was restructured as Airbus Military Sociedad Limitada (AMSL), prior to the execution of the production contract.

The Military Transport Aircraft Division (MTAD) was a division of EADS which designed, manufactured and sold EADS-CASA light and medium transport aircraft, headquartered in Madrid, Spain.

On 16 December 2008, EADS announced that MTAD and AMSL would be integrated into Airbus as part of Airbus Military.

In February 2009, Domingo Ureňa-Raso was appointed chair and CEO of Airbus Military.

On July 31, 2013, parent company EADS announced its reorganization as the Airbus Group. Airbus Military, Astrium, and Cassidian were merged and reorganized to form a new division: Airbus Defence and Space, marking the end of the Airbus Military corporate entity. Airbus Group's two other divisions are Airbus and Airbus Helicopters

Evolution

Products
 Airbus A330 MRTT
 Airbus A400M
 CASA C-212 Aviocar
 CASA/IPTN CN-235
 EADS CASA C-295

Gallery

See also
 CASA FITS

References

External links
 Airbus Military website

Airbus Defence and Space
Multinational aircraft manufacturers
Manufacturing companies based in Madrid
Former Airbus subsidiaries and divisions